Prochoreutis ultimana is a moth of the family Choreutidae. It is found from Sweden, Finland, the Baltic states and northern Russia to Japan.

The wingspan is 10–11 mm.

References

External links
lepiforum.de
Japanese Moths

Prochoreutis
Moths of Japan
Moths of Europe